Madam Dora DuFran or Dora Bolshaw (née Amy Helen Dorothy Bolshaw; November 16, 1868 – August 5, 1934) was one of the leading and most successful madams in the Old West days of Deadwood, South Dakota.

Biography 
DuFran was born in Liverpool, England and emigrated to the United States with her parents Joseph John (November 14, 1842 - March 26, 1911) and Isabella Neal (Cummings) Bolshaw (November 12, 1844 - April 12, 1911) sometime around 1869. The family settled first at Bloomfield, New Jersey, then moved to Lincoln, Nebraska in 1876 or 1877. She was an extremely good looking woman in her youth, and became involved in prostitution around the age of 13 or 14. She then became a dance hall girl, calling herself Amy Helen Bolshaw. The gold rush hit Deadwood, South Dakota when she was around 15, and Dora promoted herself to Madam and began operating a brothel.

DuFran coined the term "cathouse".

Career 
DuFran preferred having pretty girls work in her brothel, but the selection in that part of the west was extremely limited. She usually did, however, demand that her girls practice good hygiene and dress well. She picked up several girls who arrived in Deadwood via the wagon train led by Charlie Utter. From time to time, Old West personality Martha Jane Burke (Calamity Jane, 1852–1903) was in her employ. Dora's main competition in Deadwood was Madam Mollie Johnson. Dora coined the term "cathouse" after having "Phatty Thompson" (a Deadwood historical fact) bring her a wagon of cats for her Deadwood brothel. It was not Charlie Utter who brought the cats.

DuFran had several brothels over the years. The most popular was called "Diddlin' Dora's", located on Fifth Avenue in Belle Fourche, South Dakota. "Diddlin' Dora's advertised itself as 'Three D's - Dining, Drinking, and Dancing - a place where you can bring your mother.' And though the cowboys frequented the popular place, most just wanted to 'get down to business,' with at least one man remarking, 'I wouldn't want my mother to know I had ever been there.'" Dora also owned The Green Front Hotel, which is where the cats were placed into service.

DuFran's other brothels in South Dakota and Montana were located in Lead, Miles City, Sturgis, and Deadwood. While in Deadwood, Dora got married and continued her brothel operations. After her husband's death, she moved the business to Rapid City, South Dakota, where she continued having success as a brothel owner.

Marriage 
DuFran married Joseph M. DuFran (June 16, 1862 - August 3, 1909), "a personable gentleman gambler" who helped grow her business.

Death 
DuFran died of heart failure in 1934. Her pet parrot Fred and husband Joseph are buried with her at Mount Moriah Cemetery in Deadwood.

Publication 
DuFran (under the pseudonym: d'Dee) published a 12-page booklet on Calamity Jane titled Low Down on Calamity Jane (1932). In 1981, this booklet was reprinted in an expanded 47-page version, edited by Helen Rezatto.

In popular culture 
 Dora DuFran is featured in Larry McMurtry's book about Calamity Jane, titled Buffalo Girls: A Novel (1990).
 In the made-for-TV movie Buffalo Girls (1995), based on McMurtry's book, Dora DuFran is played by Melanie Griffith.
 In the HBO TV series Deadwood and Deadwood: The Movie, the character of Joanie Stubbs is loosely based on Dora DuFran. Joanie Stubbs is played by actress Kim Dickens.

References 

People from Deadwood, South Dakota
People from Lincoln, Nebraska
People of the American Old West
1868 births
1934 deaths
American prostitutes
American brothel owners and madams
People from Rapid City, South Dakota
British emigrants to the United States